thumb

S Venkata Mohan (born 1 July 1970) is an Indian engineer who has specialization in Environmental Engineering, Environmental Biotechnology, Bioenergy, Bioengineering. The Council of Scientific and Industrial Research, the apex agency of the Government of India for scientific research, awarded him the Shanti Swarup Bhatnagar Prize for Science and Technology, one of the highest Indian science awards, in 2014, for his contributions to Engineering Sciences.

Dr.Mohan is working as a Scientist in CSIR-Indian Institute of Chemical Technology (CSIR-IICT), Hyderabad since 1998.  He has done his B.Tech (Civil Engineering),  M.Tech (Environmental Engineering) and PhD Environmentl Engineering)from Sri Venkateswara University, Tirupati.  He was  Alexander von Humboldt (AvH) Fellow at Technical University of Munich, Germany (2001-02), Visiting Professor at Kyoto University (2005) and Kyung Hee International Fellow, South Korea (2018). Dr Mohan  is placed in  2nd  position in India and 29th  position in World in the field of ‘Biotechnology’ (0.057%) as per Standford University 2% Global Scientist List (https://journals.plos.org/plosbiology/article?id=10.1371/journal.pbio.3000918). Dr Mohan research majorly intended to understand and respond to the human-induced environmental change in the framework of sustainability in the interface of environment and bioengineering. He specifically explored the potential of negatively valued waste as a viable feedstock for harnessing clean energy and low carbon chemical/materials by developing novel and sustainable technologies through a nexus approach. His main research interests are in the areas of Advanced Waste Remediation, Aciodogenesis, Microbial Electrogenesis, Photosynthesis, CO2 biosequestration, Circular Bioeconomy, Self-regenerative systems and Biorefinery. He also undertook various research projects associated with societal relevance and industrial/consultancy projects in the area of environment and management. He has successfully demonstrated the production of Low-Carbon (Bio)Hydrogen from waste remediation at pilot scale and established a first of its kind waste biorefinery platform.  

Dr Mohan authored more than 400 research articles, 60 chapters for books, edited 4 books and has 9 patents. His publications have more than 28,000 citations with an h-index of 90 (Google Scholar). He has guided 29 PhDs, 2 M.Phils and more than 100 M.Tech/B.Tech/M.Sc students. 

Dr Mohan is recipient of the coveted ‘Shanti Swarup Bhatnagar (SSB) Prize’ for the year 2014 in Engineering Sciences from the Government of India. He also received several awards and honours, which include, 'DBT-Tata Innovation Fellow 2018' by Department of Biotechnology, VASVIK  Award for the year 2018 in the category of ‘Environmental Science and Technology’ by Vividhlaxi Audyohik Samshodhan Vikas Kendra, ‘Most outstanding Researcher' in the field of Environmental Science in India-2018 by Careers 360, SERB-IGCW-2017 for ‘Biohydrogen Technology’ from DST-SERB and Green ChemisTree Foundation, 'Environmental Engineering Design Award 2017' by the National Design and Research Forum (NDRF) of Institute of Engineers, India (2017), ‘National Bioscience Award-2012’ by Department of Biotechnology (DBT),‘Prosper.net-Scopus Young Researcher Award in Sustainable Development-2010’ under Energy Category by United Nations University and Elsevier, ‘NASI-Scopus Young Scientist Award- 2010’ in Earth, Oceanographic & Environmental Sciences by NASI and Elsevier and Nawab Zain Yar Jung Bahadur Memorial Prize-1994 by The Institution of Engineers (India). 

Dr Mohan is Fellow of National Academy of Engineering, Biotech Research Society of India, Telangana and Andhra Pradesh Akademy of Sciences, Alexander Von Humboldt Foundation (AvH), International Forum on Industrial Bioprocesses, Institution of Engineers, International Society for Energy, Environment and Sustainability and Association for Biotechnology and Pharmacy  . 

Dr Mohan is subject Editor for the Journal of Energy, and is serving on the Editorial Board of journals viz., Bioresource Technology, Materials Circular Economy, Carbon Resources Conversion, Journal of Environmental Science and Engineering and Materials Science for Energy Technologies.

References 

1970 births
Living people
Indian biochemists
N-BIOS Prize recipients
Recipients of the Shanti Swarup Bhatnagar Award in Engineering Science